Federal Route 22, Asian Highway Route AH150 (formerly Federal Route A4), is a   federal highway in Sabah, Malaysia, which is also a component of the larger Pan Borneo Highway network. It starts from Tamparuli and ends at Sandakan. The section running from Tamparuli to Ranau, which is known as Tamparuli-Ranau Highway, crosses the Crocker Range just to the south of Mount Kinabalu.

History
The construction of the Federal Route 22 began in 1968 as a joint project between the Malaysian federal government with the government of Australia, known as the "Malaysian-Australian Road Project" (MARP). It was one of the two projects being jointly carried out with the Australian government, together with the Pergau Dam project in Kelantan, with the total cost of RM25 million for both projects. The construction was done in two phases - the construction of the first phase from Sandakan to Telupid began in 1968 and completed in 1971, while the second phase from Telupid to Ranau was constructed in 1971 and completed in 1972. Both sections were paved in 1973 and were completed in 1978. Meanwhile, the final section of the FT22 highway from Ranau to Tamparuli was constructed right after the Sandakan-Ranau section was opened to motorists. The Tamparuli-Ranau section was completed in 1982. The highway was coded as A4 according to the old numbering scheme, but was later changed to FT22 in 1996 to standardise the route numbering system with Peninsular Malaysia.

List of interchanges

References

External links 

Highways in Malaysia
Roads in Sabah